The Norwegian Law (HaḤok HaNorvegi), initially Mini-Norwegian Law for its first version, is a name given to an amendment to the Basic Law: The Knesset, one of the Basic Laws of Israel. It affects the appointment of ministers and members of the Knesset. The amendment allows ministers or deputy ministers to resign from the Knesset but remain a minister, with their Knesset seat taken by the next person on the party's list. If the person who resigned leaves the cabinet, they are able to return to the Knesset in place of their replacement. The law initially limited each party to one resignation and replacement. The legislation became commonly known as the 'Norwegian Law' due to a similar system being in place in Norway. The amendment was approved by the Knesset by a vote of 64–51 on 30 July 2015.

An expanded version of the law, which allowed all ministers to resign and be replaced, was passed on 15 June 2020 by a vote of 66–43.

See also
 Ministerial by-elections
 Dualism (politics)
Replacements during the twentieth Knesset
Replacements during the twenty-third Knesset
Replacements during the twenty-fourth Knesset

References

Israeli laws
2015 in law
2015 in Israel
20th Knesset (2015–2019)
Politics of Israel